Entomobielziidae is a family of millipedes belonging to the order Chordeumatida.

Genera:
 Alloiopus Attems, 1951
 Bielzia
 Bielziana
 Entomobielzia Verhoeff, 1898
 Moldavobielzia Ceuca, 1985
 Pseudoclis Attems, 1899
 Tianella Attems, 1904

References

Chordeumatida
Millipede families